Nikolaos Paparrodou (1902 – 1980) was a Greek fencer. He competed in the team sabre event at the 1936 Summer Olympics.

References

1902 births
1980 deaths
Greek male fencers
Olympic fencers of Greece
Fencers at the 1936 Summer Olympics
20th-century Greek people